Hossein Rahmati (born March 21, 1994) is an Iranian professional basketball player.

He currently plays for Fryshuset in the Swedish Basketball League as well as for the Iranian national basketball team, as a Power Forward. He is 6'8" in height. He was a member of Iran national youth team and attending World Youth Cup Competition in Prague, 2013 FIBA Under-19 World Championship FIBA Under-19 World Championship.

External links

References 

Iranian men's basketball players
Living people
Basketball players at the 2010 Summer Youth Olympics
Asian Games silver medalists for Iran
Asian Games medalists in basketball
Basketball players at the 2014 Asian Games
Power forwards (basketball)
Mahram Tehran BC players
Medalists at the 2014 Asian Games
2014 FIBA Basketball World Cup players
2019 FIBA Basketball World Cup players
1994 births
People from Khorramabad